The Leader of the Opposition in the Legislative Council is an office held in New South Wales by the leader in the New South Wales Legislative Council of the second-largest party in the New South Wales Legislative Assembly, the lower house of the Parliament of New South Wales.

Notes

References

Legislative Council Opposition Leader
New South Wales Legislative Council